Norberto Collado Abreu (February 23, 1921 – April 2, 2008) was the Cuban captain and helmsman of the yacht Granma, which ferried Fidel Castro and 81 supporters to Cuba from Tuxpan, Veracruz, Mexico, in 1956. The 1956 landing of Castro from the Granma in eastern Cuba launched the Cuban Revolution which resulted in the overthrow of President Fulgencio Batista in 1959.

Collado Abreu joined the Cuban Navy in April 1941 during World War II.

However, Collado Abreu's left-wing sympathies landed him in jail following the war, where he met Fidel Castro, who was also imprisoned at the time. Both Castro and Collado Abreu were later freed as part of an amnesty program. The two went into exile in Mexico, along with other supporters of Castro.

The Granma set sail under Castro on the night of November 25, 1956, from the Veracruz port city of Tuxpan.  Collado Abreu captained the Granma, which carried a total of 82 prominent supporters of the Cuban Revolution, including Fidel Castro, Raúl Castro, Camilo Cienfuegos and Che Guevara, from Mexico to its landing site in Granma Province in eastern Cuba. The landing on December 2, 1956, marked the start of the Cuban Revolution, which toppled Fulgencio Batista from power in 1959. Collado Abreu was captured shortly after landing the Granma in Cuba. He was sentenced to prison, where he remained until the triumph of the Revolution in 1959.

Collado Abreu continued to work in various capacities for the Cuban Navy after the Revolution until 1981.

Norberto Collado Abreu died in Cuba on April 2, 2008. The Cuban News Agency, a Cuban state run news agency, did not disclose his age or cause of death at the time. His funeral was held the same day as his death at the Pantheon of the Revolutionary Armed Forces in Colon Cemetery in Havana.

References

External links
After receiving U.S. congressional recognition, he became the ‘Granma’ helmsman Granma Internacional, 2001-11-30

1921 births
2008 deaths
Cuban military personnel
Cuban communists
People of the Cuban Revolution